Ong Ka Ting (born 15 November 1956) is a Malaysian politician. He was the former Housing and Local Government Minister from 1999 to 2008 and Acting Transport Minister from May to June 2003 in the Malaysian cabinet. Ong also served as the seventh president of the Malaysian Chinese Association (MCA), a major component party in Barisan Nasional (BN); from May 2003 to October 2008. He was appointed Special Envoy of Malaysia to China on 1 November 2011. He relinquished the Special Envoy's post on 31 December 2017 after serving three terms.

Early life
Ong was born on 15 November 1956 in Lenggong, Perak. He graduated from University of Malaya, majoring in Mathematics and Science in 1980. He began his career as a chemistry teacher in Catholic High School in Petaling Jaya from 1981 until 1986.

MCA former secretary-general for twice, Ong Ka Chuan, is his elder brother.

He is married to Puan Sri Wendy Chong Siew Mei. The couple have two children – Chloe Ong Li En and Ong Xing Yang.

Political career
From 1986 until 1990, Ong was the political secretary to Ling Liong Sik, the MCA president and Minister of Transport then. After winning the 1990 general elections to be Member of Parliament (MP) of Pontian, he was appointed Parliamentary Secretary to the Ministry of Health from 26 October 1990 until 24 February 1991. Ong was next appointed Parliamentary Secretary to the Ministry of Home Affairs from 25 February 1991 through April 1995, before being promoted to be the Deputy Minister of the same Ministry on 3 May 1993.

In 1999, he was promoted to become a full-fledged minister leading the Ministry of Housing and Local Government, a position he held until 2008. In a 2003 leadership transition plan which saw Ong and Chan Kong Choy were elected to succeed retiring Ling and Lim Ah Lek as party President and Deputy President respectively. In 2004, he retained his parliamentary seat of Tanjung Piai with a 23,615 votes majority over the opposition candidate. In January 2008, he was appointed as Acting Health Minister following the resignation of Dr. Chua Soi Lek who was involved in a sex scandal.

In the 2008 general election, Ong succeeded in his bid for the Kulai Parliamentary seat. However, the election was marked by heavy losses for the ruling BN coalition, especially among candidates from the MCA and Malaysian Indian Congress (MIC). In the subsequent Cabinet reshuffle, Ong was not retained as a member of the Cabinet by his request, as he wanted to focus his energies in restructuring and re-engineering the MCA to win back Chinese voters' support. His former Cabinet portfolio was handed over to his elder brother, Ong Ka Chuan who was MCA Secretary-General, Perak MCA chief and MP of Tanjung Malim in Perak.

In 2008, he had left the presidency of MCA and had passed the highest post of the party to Ong Tee Keat after the successful party election on 18 October 2008. After leaving the post for one and a half years, on 17 March 2010 Ong Ka Ting announced his intention to contest for the party's presidency in the 28 March party elections. He contested the presidency against incumbent Ong Tee Keat and reinstated deputy president Dr. Chua Soi Lek in a three-corner fight. However he failed in the comeback attempt and was defeated by Dr. Chua. 

In 2013, Ong decided not to recontest his parliamentary seat in the 2013 general election thus retire as a six-term MP.

Election results

Honours

Honours of Malaysia
  :
  Commander of the Order of the Defender of the Realm (PMN) – Tan Sri (2009)
  :
  Knight Commander of the Order of the Perak State Crown (DPMP) – Dato' (1997)
  Knight Grand Commander of the Order of the Perak State Crown (SPMP) – Dato' Seri (2000)
  :
  Knight Commander of the Order of the Crown of Selangor (DPMS) – Dato' (2005)

References

 
 
 

1956 births
People from Perak
Living people
Malaysian people of Hokkien descent
Malaysian people of Chinese descent
Malaysian Buddhists
Malaysian politicians of Chinese descent
Presidents of Malaysian Chinese Association
Malaysian Chinese Association politicians
Members of the Dewan Rakyat
Government ministers of Malaysia
University of Malaya alumni
Commanders of the Order of the Defender of the Realm
Knights Commander of the Order of the Crown of Selangor
21st-century Malaysian politicians